Events from the year 1737 in Sweden

Incumbents
 Monarch – Frederick I

Events
 
  
 
 
 4 October - The first professional Swedish language theatre is inaugurated at Bollhuset in Stockholm by the first group of professional Swedish stage actors, playing a translated French play.  
 October - The first Swedish satire play, Svenska Sprätthöken by Carl Gyllenborg, is performed at the Swedish theatre at Bollhuset with Beata Sabina Straas and Peter Lindahl.

Births

Deaths

 
 3 June - Gustaf Cronhielm, politician  (died 1664) 
 
 - Maria Gustava Gyllenstierna, writer and translator

References

 
Years of the 18th century in Sweden
Sweden